Elektronika MS 1504 was the first, and reportedly only, laptop computer to be manufactured in the Soviet Union. Produced by the "Integral" Scientific Production Association in 1991, it was a clone of the Toshiba T1100 Plus.

References

Ministry of the Electronics Industry (Soviet Union) computers